The 1994 Pittsburgh Pirates season was their 113th season; the 108th in the National League. This was their 25th season at Three Rivers Stadium. The Pirates finished the shortened season third in the National League Central with a record of 53–61. They hosted the 1994 Major League Baseball All-Star Game in the 125th Anniversary season of Major League Baseball.

Offseason
January 5, 1994: Gary Varsho was signed as a free agent with the Pittsburgh Pirates.
March 28, 1994: Gary Varsho was released by the Pittsburgh Pirates.
March 29, 1994: Gary Varsho was signed as a free agent with the Pittsburgh Pirates.

Regular season

The Pirates had scored 466 runs (4.09 per game) and allowed 580 runs (5.09 per game) with a 53-61 record by Friday, August 12, 1994, when the MLB Players' strike began. Pittsburgh struggled offensively during the season, finishing 28th in runs scored (466), runs batted in (435), home runs (80, tied with the Philadelphia Phillies), total bases (1,485) and slugging percentage (.384). They were shut out 11 times in 114 games, the most in the Majors. One highlight of the season was their 4-0 shutout of the best team in baseball, the Montreal Expos, at Three Rivers Stadium on Thursday, August 11, just one day prior to the strike. Zane Smith picked up the win for the Pirates.

Season standings

Game log

|- bgcolor="ffbbbb"
| 1 || April 4 || @ Giants || 0–8 || Burkett || Smith (0–1) || — || 58,077 || 0–1
|- bgcolor="ffbbbb"
| 2 || April 5 || @ Giants || 0–2 || Swift || Cooke (0–1) || Beck || 20,674 || 0–2
|- bgcolor="ffbbbb"
| 3 || April 6 || @ Giants || 2–4 || Portugal || Neagle (0–1) || — || 19,567 || 0–3
|- bgcolor="ffbbbb"
| 4 || April 8 || Rockies || 3–7 || Nied || Wagner (0–1) || — || 44,136 || 0–4
|- bgcolor="ccffcc"
| 5 || April 9 || Rockies || 10–5 || Smith (1–1) || Reynoso || — || 17,458 || 1–4
|- bgcolor="ccffcc"
| 6 || April 12 || Padres || 4–2 || Dewey (1–0) || Davis || White (1) || 8,840 || 2–4
|- bgcolor="ccffcc"
| 7 || April 13 || Padres || 3–2 || Neagle (1–1) || Worrell || White (2) || 8,471 || 3–4
|- bgcolor="ccffcc"
| 8 || April 14 || Padres || 4–2 || Wagner (1–1) || Benes || Ballard (1) || 13,654 || 4–4
|- bgcolor="ccffcc"
| 9 || April 15 || Dodgers || 6–4 || White (1–0) || Wayne || — || 16,510 || 5–4
|- bgcolor="ccffcc"
| 10 || April 16 || Dodgers || 4–3 || Manzanillo (1–0) || Dreifort || — || 17,180 || 6–4
|- bgcolor="ffbbbb"
| 11 || April 17 || Dodgers || 2–19 || Candiotti || Cooke (0–2) || — || 22,590 || 6–5
|- bgcolor="ffbbbb"
| 12 || April 19 || @ Reds || 2–8 || Rijo || Neagle (1–2) || — || 23,891 || 6–6
|- bgcolor="ffbbbb"
| 13 || April 20 || @ Reds || 4–5 || Ruffin || Wagner (1–2) || Carrasco || 20,341 || 6–7
|- bgcolor="ccffcc"
| 14 || April 22 || @ Braves || 5–2 || Smith (2–1) || Smoltz || White (3) || 49,223 || 7–7
|- bgcolor="ccffcc"
| 15 || April 23 || @ Braves || 6–1 || Ballard (1–0) || McMichael || — || 49,350 || 8–7
|- bgcolor="ffbbbb"
| 16 || April 24 || @ Braves || 0–3 || Maddux || Cooke (0–3) || — || 49,522 || 8–8
|- bgcolor="ffbbbb"
| 17 || April 25 || @ Astros || 3–7 || Harnisch || Neagle (1–3) || — || 16,007 || 8–9
|- bgcolor="ccffcc"
| 18 || April 26 || @ Astros || 7–4 || Dewey (2–0) || Jones || White (4) || 23,151 || 9–9
|- bgcolor="ccffcc"
| 19 || April 27 || Reds || 3–1 || Smith (3–1) || Smiley || — || 10,343 || 10–9
|- bgcolor="ffbbbb"
| 20 || April 28 || Reds || 7–19 || Hanson || Tomlin (0–1) || — || 10,846 || 10–10
|- bgcolor="ccffcc"
| 21 || April 29 || Braves || 8–5 || Cooke (1–3) || Avery || — || 27,615 || 11–10
|- bgcolor="ccffcc"
| 22 || April 30 || Braves || 2–1 || Neagle (2–3) || Maddux || White (5) || 25,967 || 12–10
|-

|- bgcolor="ccffcc"
| 23 || May 1 || Braves || 4–1 || Wagner (2–2) || Glavine || — || 30,614 || 13–10
|- bgcolor="ffbbbb"
| 24 || May 3 || Astros || 4–7 || Drabek || Smith (3–2) || Williams || 9,790 || 13–11
|- bgcolor="ffbbbb"
| 25 || May 4 || Astros || 4–7 || Kile || Tomlin (0–2) || — || 10,121 || 13–12
|- bgcolor="ffbbbb"
| 26 || May 6 || Cubs || 1–10 || Young || Neagle (2–4) || — || 22,426 || 13–13
|- bgcolor="ccffcc"
| 27 || May 8 || Cubs || 9–2 || Wagner (3–2) || Banks || — || — || 14–13
|- bgcolor="ccffcc"
| 28 || May 8 || Cubs || 9–3 || Smith (4–2) || Morgan || — || 21,772 || 15–13
|- bgcolor="ccffcc"
| 29 || May 9 || @ Marlins || 9–5 || Pena (1–0) || Bowen || — || 28,738 || 16–13
|- bgcolor="ffbbbb"
| 30 || May 10 || @ Marlins || 0–1 || Hammond || Tomlin (0–3) || Hernandez || 27,177 || 16–14
|- bgcolor="ccffcc"
| 31 || May 11 || @ Marlins || 5–1 || Neagle (3–4) || Weathers || — || 35,187 || 17–14
|- bgcolor="ffbbbb"
| 32 || May 12 || @ Phillies || 4–6 || Greene || Smith (4–3) || Jones || 32,481 || 17–15
|- bgcolor="ffbbbb"
| 33 || May 13 || @ Phillies || 1–12 || Jackson || Wagner (3–3) || — || 32,281 || 17–16
|- bgcolor="ffbbbb"
| 34 || May 14 || @ Phillies || 2–3 || Williams || Cooke (1–4) || Jones || 39,916 || 17–17
|- bgcolor="ffbbbb"
| 35 || May 15 || @ Phillies || 0–1 || Boskie || Lieber (0–1) || Jones || 53,396 || 17–18
|- bgcolor="ccffcc"
| 36 || May 16 || Cardinals || 7–2 || Neagle (4–4) || Tewksbury || — || 15,067 || 18–18
|- bgcolor="ffbbbb"
| 37 || May 17 || Cardinals || 0–2 || Urbani || Smith (4–4) || Arocha || 11,173 || 18–19
|- bgcolor="ffbbbb"
| 38 || May 18 || Cardinals || 3–4 (10) || Perez || White (1–1) || Arocha || 10,043 || 18–20
|- bgcolor="ffbbbb"
| 39 || May 20 || Expos || 3–5 || Hill || Pena (1–1) || Wetteland || 30,804 || 18–21
|- bgcolor="ccffcc"
| 40 || May 21 || Expos || 6–0 || Lieber (1–1) || Rueter || — || 28,022 || 19–21
|- bgcolor="ffbbbb"
| 41 || May 22 || Expos || 2–3 || Martinez || Neagle (4–5) || Wetteland || 39,037 || 19–22
|- bgcolor="ffbbbb"
| 42 || May 24 || Mets || 2–4 || Jones || White (1–2) || Franco || 11,781 || 19–23
|- bgcolor="ffbbbb"
| 43 || May 25 || Mets || 3–6 || Saberhagen || Wagner (3–4) || Franco || 16,847 || 19–24
|- bgcolor="ccffcc"
| 44 || May 26 || Mets || 11–10 (13) || Pena (2–1) || Seminara || — || 14,132 || 20–24
|- bgcolor="ffbbbb"
| 45 || May 27 || @ Dodgers || 5–6 (10) || Osuna || White (1–3) || — || 44,145 || 20–25
|- bgcolor="ccffcc"
| 46 || May 28 || @ Dodgers || 7–2 || Neagle (5–5) || Astacio || — || 47,771 || 21–25
|- bgcolor="ffbbbb"
| 47 || May 29 || @ Dodgers || 3–4 || Gross || Smith (4–5) || Dreifort || 44,622 || 21–26
|- bgcolor="ffbbbb"
| 48 || May 30 || @ Padres || 2–10 || Ashby || Manzanillo (1–1) || — || 12,756 || 21–27
|- bgcolor="ffbbbb"
| 49 || May 31 || @ Padres || 5–15 || Benes || Cooke (1–5) || — || 7,094 || 21–28
|-

|- bgcolor="ffbbbb"
| 50 || June 1 || @ Padres || 4–6 || Martinez || Lieber (1–2) || Hoffman || 13,505 || 21–29
|- bgcolor="ffbbbb"
| 51 || June 3 || @ Rockies || 4–6 || Freeman || Neagle (5–6) || Ruffin || 53,737 || 21–30
|- bgcolor="ccffcc"
| 52 || June 4 || @ Rockies || 4–3 || Smith (5–5) || Ritz || Dewey (1) || 61,619 || 22–30
|- bgcolor="ccffcc"
| 53 || June 5 || @ Rockies || 4–3 || White (2–3) || Moore || Ballard (2) || 63,653 || 23–30
|- bgcolor="ffbbbb"
| 54 || June 6 || Giants || 3–4 || Swift || Pena (2–2) || Beck || 17,249 || 23–31
|- bgcolor="ffbbbb"
| 55 || June 7 || Giants || 2–3 (10) || Beck || White (2–4) || — || 15,744 || 23–32
|- bgcolor="ccffcc"
| 56 || June 8 || Giants || 3–1 || Neagle (6–6) || Torres || — || 14,822 || 24–32
|- bgcolor="ccffcc"
| 57 || June 9 || Marlins || 3–1 || Smith (6–5) || Hough || Pena (1) || 11,395 || 25–32
|- bgcolor="ccffcc"
| 58 || June 10 || Marlins || 5–4 || Wagner (4–4) || Hammond || Pena (2) || 25,120 || 26–32
|- bgcolor="ccffcc"
| 59 || June 11 || Marlins || 10–4 || Cooke (2–5) || Miller || — || 24,763 || 27–32
|- bgcolor="ccffcc"
| 60 || June 12 || Marlins || 5–1 || Lieber (2–2) || Weathers || — || 34,728 || 28–32
|- bgcolor="ffbbbb"
| 61 || June 13 || @ Expos || 2–10 || Fassero || Neagle (6–7) || — || 17,236 || 28–33
|- bgcolor="ffbbbb"
| 62 || June 14 || @ Expos || 7–12 || Martinez || Smith (6–6) || Wetteland || 15,781 || 28–34
|- bgcolor="ffbbbb"
| 63 || June 15 || @ Expos || 2–13 || Hill || Wagner (4–5) || Henry || 21,269 || 28–35
|- bgcolor="ccffcc"
| 64 || June 16 || @ Cardinals || 7–5 (10) || Pena (3–2) || Perez || White (6) || 28,011 || 29–35
|- bgcolor="ccffcc"
| 65 || June 17 || @ Cardinals || 7–4 || Lieber (3–2) || Tewksbury || Pena (3) || 34,177 || 30–35
|- bgcolor="ffbbbb"
| 66 || June 18 || @ Cardinals || 0–9 || Arocha || Neagle (6–8) || — || 42,050 || 30–36
|- bgcolor="ccffcc"
| 67 || June 19 || @ Cardinals || 3–2 || Smith (7–6) || Palacios || Pena (4) || 36,152 || 31–36
|- bgcolor="ccffcc"
| 68 || June 21 || Phillies || 7–1 || Cooke (3–5) || Boskie || — || 19,568 || 32–36
|- bgcolor="ccffcc"
| 69 || June 22 || Phillies || 5–4 || Manzanillo (2–1) || Slocumb || Pena (5) || 26,376 || 33–36
|- bgcolor="ccffcc"
| 70 || June 24 || @ Mets || 9–4 || Neagle (7–8) || Gooden || — || 19,977 || 34–36
|- bgcolor="ccffcc"
| 71 || June 25 || @ Mets || 3–1 || Smith (8–6) || Saberhagen || Pena (6) || 32,962 || 35–36
|- bgcolor="ccffcc"
| 72 || June 26 || @ Mets || 7–3 || Wagner (5–5) || Jones || — || 29,814 || 36–36
|- bgcolor="ffbbbb"
| 73 || June 27 || @ Cubs || 1–2 || Banks || Ballard (1–1) || Myers || 34,665 || 36–37
|- bgcolor="ccffcc"
| 74 || June 28 || @ Cubs || 6–5 || Lieber (4–2) || Morgan || Pena (7) || 30,783 || 37–37
|- bgcolor="ffbbbb"
| 75 || June 29 || @ Cubs || 5–6 || Crim || Manzanillo (2–2) || — || 29,267 || 37–38
|- bgcolor="ccffcc"
| 76 || June 30 || Reds || 6–4 || Dyer (1–0) || Carrasco || Manzanillo (1) || 16,330 || 38–38
|-

|- bgcolor="ffbbbb"
| 77 || July 1 || Reds || 2–4 || Roper || Wagner (5–6) || Brantley || 32,956 || 38–39
|- bgcolor="ffbbbb"
| 78 || July 2 || Reds || 2–8 || Hanson || Cooke (3–6) || — || 27,376 || 38–40
|- bgcolor="ffbbbb"
| 79 || July 3 || Reds || 3–4 || Smiley || Lieber (4–3) || Brantley || 27,499 || 38–41
|- bgcolor="ccffcc"
| 80 || July 5 || @ Braves || 3–1 (7) || Neagle (8–8) || Smoltz || — || 49,493 || 39–41
|- bgcolor="ccffcc"
| 81 || July 6 || @ Braves || 3–1 || Smith (9–6) || Wohlers || Dyer (1) || — || 40–41
|- bgcolor="ffbbbb"
| 82 || July 6 || @ Braves || 2–4 || Avery || Wagner (5–7) || McMichael || 46,387 || 40–42
|- bgcolor="ffbbbb"
| 83 || July 7 || @ Reds || 7–8 (11) || Ruffin || Minor (0–1) || — || 28,488 || 40–43
|- bgcolor="ffbbbb"
| 84 || July 8 || @ Reds || 4–12 || Smiley || Lieber (4–4) || — || 34,167 || 40–44
|- bgcolor="ffbbbb"
| 85 || July 9 || @ Reds || 3–5 || Rijo || White (2–5) || Brantley || 42,044 || 40–45
|- bgcolor="ccffcc"
| 86 || July 10 || @ Reds || 7–6 (11) || Cooke (4–6) || Carrasco || Minor (1) || 33,419 || 41–45
|- bgcolor="ccffcc"
| 87 || July 14 || Astros || 8–2 || Lieber (5–4) || Kile || — || 15,847 || 42–45
|- bgcolor="ccffcc"
| 88 || July 15 || Astros || 11–8 || Manzanillo (3–2) || Reynolds || Dyer (2) || 19,185 || 43–45
|- bgcolor="ffbbbb"
| 89 || July 16 || Astros || 1–7 || Harnisch || Smith (9–7) || — || 30,595 || 43–46
|- bgcolor="ffbbbb"
| 90 || July 17 || Astros || 0–9 || Reynolds || Wagner (5–8) || — || 23,290 || 43–47
|- bgcolor="ffbbbb"
| 91 || July 18 || Braves || 2–3 || Mercker || Cooke (4–7) || — || 16,528 || 43–48
|- bgcolor="ccffcc"
| 92 || July 19 || Braves || 13–10 || Miceli (1–0) || Olson || — || 18,147 || 44–48
|- bgcolor="ccffcc"
| 93 || July 20 || Braves || 5–4 || Wagner (6–8) || Glavine || Dyer (3) || 36,087 || 45–48
|- bgcolor="ffbbbb"
| 94 || July 21 || @ Astros || 6–13 || Harnisch || Smith (9–8) || — || 27,659 || 45–49
|- bgcolor="ccffcc"
| 95 || July 22 || @ Astros || 4–1 || Manzanillo (4–2) || Drabek || Dyer (4) || 37,002 || 46–49
|- bgcolor="ffbbbb"
| 96 || July 23 || @ Astros || 0–11 || Reynolds || Cooke (4–8) || — || 41,262 || 46–50
|- bgcolor="ffbbbb"
| 97 || July 24 || @ Astros || 1–13 || Kile || Lieber (5–5) || — || 36,874 || 46–51
|- bgcolor="ccffcc"
| 98 || July 25 || Cubs || 6–2 || Neagle (9–8) || Banks || Miceli (1) || 13,346 || 47–51
|- bgcolor="ffbbbb"
| 99 || July 26 || Cubs || 4–8 || Bautista || Dewey (2–1) || — || 12,839 || 47–52
|- bgcolor="ccffcc"
| 100 || July 27 || Cubs || 9–4 || White (3–5) || Morgan || — || 11,766 || 48–52
|- bgcolor="ffbbbb"
| 101 || July 28 || Cubs || 3–10 || Foster || Cooke (4–9) || — || 13,492 || 48–53
|- bgcolor="ffbbbb"
| 102 || July 29 || Mets || 1–4 || Jones || Lieber (5–6) || Franco || 33,349 || 48–54
|- bgcolor="ccffcc"
| 103 || July 30 || Mets || 3–2 (10) || Miceli (2–0) || Mason || — || 29,516 || 49–54
|- bgcolor="ffbbbb"
| 104 || July 31 || Mets || 4–6 || Gozzo || Dyer (1–1) || Franco || 24,308 || 49–55
|-

|- bgcolor="ccffcc"
| 105 || August 2 || @ Phillies || 3–2 || White (4–5) || Munoz || Miceli (2) || 40,164 || 50–55
|- bgcolor="ffbbbb"
| 106 || August 3 || @ Phillies || 0–7 || Jackson || Cooke (4–10) || — || 36,542 || 50–56
|- bgcolor="ccffcc"
| 107 || August 4 || @ Phillies || 5–1 || Lieber (6–6) || Schilling || — || 37,481 || 51–56
|- bgcolor="ffbbbb"
| 108 || August 5 || Cardinals || 3–11 || Palacios || Neagle (9–9) || — || 23,029 || 51–57
|- bgcolor="ffbbbb"
| 109 || August 6 || Cardinals || 3–6 || Rodriguez || Miceli (2–1) || Arocha || 22,741 || 51–58
|- bgcolor="ccffcc"
| 110 || August 7 || Cardinals || 6–5 || Wagner (7–8) || Eversgerd || — || 21,858 || 52–58
|- bgcolor="ffbbbb"
| 111 || August 8 || Expos || 2–3 || Heredia || Cooke (4–11) || Wetteland || 16,722 || 52–59
|- bgcolor="ffbbbb"
| 112 || August 9 || Expos || 3–4 || Rueter || Lieber (6–7) || Wetteland || 18,183 || 52–60
|- bgcolor="ffbbbb"
| 113 || August 10 || Expos || 0–4 || Martinez || Neagle (9–10) || Wetteland || 15,690 || 52–61
|- bgcolor="ccffcc"
| 114 || August 11 || Expos || 4–0 || Smith (10–8) || Henry || — || 16,896 || 53–61
|-

|-
| Legend:       = Win       = LossBold = Pirates team member

Record vs. opponents

Detailed records

Roster

Opening Day lineup

Player stats
Batting
Note: G = Games played; AB = At bats; H = Hits; Avg. = Batting average; HR = Home runs; RBI = Runs batted in

Pitching
Note: G = Games pitched; IP = Innings pitched; W = Wins; L = Losses; ERA = Earned run average; SO = Strikeouts

All-Star game
The 1994 Major League Baseball All-Star Game was the 65th playing of the midsummer classic between the all-stars of the American League (AL) and National League (NL), the two leagues comprising Major League Baseball. The game was held on July 12, 1994, at Three Rivers Stadium in Pittsburgh, Pennsylvania, the home of the Pittsburgh Pirates of the National League. The game resulted in the National League defeating the American League 8-7 in 10 innings. It was the National League's first win since 1987.

Awards and honors

1994 Major League Baseball All-Star Game
Carlos García, 2B, reserve

Notable transactions
 August 31, 1994: Aramis Ramírez was signed by the Pittsburgh Pirates as an amateur free agent.

Farm system

References

 1994 Pittsburgh Pirates at Baseball Reference
 1994 Pittsburgh Pirates at Baseball Almanac

Pittsburgh Pirates seasons
Pittsburgh Pirates season
Pitts